Dihammaphoroides is a genus of beetles in the family Cerambycidae, containing the following species:

 Dihammaphoroides jaufferti Galileo & Martins, 2003
 Dihammaphoroides sanguinicollis Zajciw, 1967

References

Rhopalophorini